The territory of present-day Romania started producing oil in 1857; oil facilities became an important  strategic military target in 1916 during World War I. The Kingdom of Romania was the largest producer of oil in Europe during World War II (with the exception of USSR whose primary oil source was in Azerbaijan), and the oil extracted from Romania was essential for  Axis military operations.  Allied bombers attacked the Romanian petrochemical industry near Ploiești heavily (see Operation Tidal Wave) before the Soviet Red Army occupied the oilfields in August 1944. After the war, significant reconstruction and expansion took place under  the communist regime. Since 1989, most of the industry has been privatized.

Possessing substantial  oil-refining capacities, present-day Romania has a particular interest in the Central Asia-Europe  pipelines and seeks to strengthen its relations with some Arab States of the Persian Gulf. Romania's refining-capacity output far exceeds domestic demand for refined petroleum products, allowing the country to export a wide range of oil products and petrochemicals — such as lubricants, bitumen, and fertilizers — throughout the eastern European region.

Refineries

This is an incomplete list of oil refineries in Romania:
 Arpechim Refinery, (Petrom/OMV), 
 Astra Refinery, (Interagro), 
 Petrobrazi Refinery, (Petrom/OMV), 
 Petromidia Constanţa Refinery, (Rompetrol), 
 Petrotel Lukoil Refinery, (LUKOIL), 
 Petrolsub Suplacu de Barcău Refinery, (Petrom/OMV), 
 RAFO Oneşti Refinery, (Calder A), 
 Steaua Romană Câmpina Refinery, (Omnimpex Chemicals), 
 Vega Ploieşti Refinery, (Rompetrol),

See also
Oil campaign of World War II
Economy of Romania
Industry of Romania
Operation Tidal Wave

1857 - First drilling of oil wells at Bend, northeast of Bucharest, on the Romanian side of the Carpathians; this year is registered as a beginning of Romania’s oil production. It happened 11 years after the drilling of the first oil well in Baku (in Bibi-Heybat settlement) in 1846.

References

External links
 Romanian Petroleum History
 www.geohelp.net/world.html
 Mirbabayev Miryusif. Brief history of the first oil drilling wells in Baku region - "Noema" (Romania), 2018, v.XVII, p.175-185
 Vassiliou Marius. Historical dictionary of petroleum industry; 2nd edition - 2018, Lanham MD: Rowman and Littlefield-Scarecrow Press. p. 593
 Marius Vassiliou, Miryusif Mirbabayev. US and Azerbaijani oil in the Nineteenth Century: Two Titans. - USA, Lexington Books Publisher, 2022. - 259 p.

Economy of Romania
Romania
Energy in Romania
Petrochemical industry
Petroleum in Romania